Sormovo may refer to:
Sormovo (airfield), an airfield near Nizhny Novgorod, Russia
Sormovsky City District (formerly a separate city of Sormovo), a city district of Nizhny Novgorod, Russia

See also
Sormovsky (disambiguation)
Krasnoye Sormovo